Robert Marion Cluggish (September 18, 1917 – September 5, 2008) was an American professional basketball player. He played collegiately for the University of Kentucky and for the New York Knicks in the Basketball Association of America (BAA) for 54 games during the 1946–47 season. He worked at Howard High School in Orlando where the gym was named after him when he retired.

BAA career statistics

Regular season

Playoffs

References

External links

1917 births
2008 deaths
American men's basketball players
Basketball players from Kentucky
Kentucky Wildcats football players
Kentucky Wildcats men's basketball players
New York Knicks players
Centers (basketball)